2,2-Diethoxytetrahydrofuran is a cyclic orthoester which can be reacted with diols to biodegradable polyorthoesters.

Preparation 
The synthesis of 2,2-diethoxytetrahydrofuran via γ-butyrolactone and the Meerwein salt (triethyloxonium tetrafluoroborate) in diethyl ether was first described by Hans Meerwein and co-workers. In the reaction the electrophilic ethyl cation attackes the carbonyl oxygen and forms the stable but extraordinarily hygroscopic O-ethyl-γ-butyrolactonium tetrafluoroborate (melting point 42 °C). The compound dissolves in dichloromethane, chloroform and 1,2-dichloroethane but is insoluble in diethyl ether, benzene and tetrachloromethane. The onium salt reacts practically quantitatively with an ethanolate anion from sodium ethoxide in ethanol forming 2,2-diethoxytetrahydrofuran.

2,2-Diethoxytetrahydrofuran can also be produced in a solvent-free one-pot reaction using γ-butyrolactone, orthoformic triethyl ester and gaseous boron trifluoride. This route avoids the use of diethyl ether and its side-products and sensible intermediates.

First diethoxymethylium tetrafluoroborate is formed from the triethyl orthoformate and boron trifluoride at -30 °C. This electrophilically attacks the carbonyl group of the γ-butyrolactone  and the O-ethyl-γ-butyrolactonium tetrafluoroborate. The addition of sodium ethoxide leads to the final product, which is obtained after distillation in 69% overall yield.

The reaction proceeds under gentle conditions (<0 °C) and the almost quantitative addition of ethanolate to O-ethyl-γ-butyrolactonium tetrafluoroborate can also be catalyzed by bases such as ammonia and triethylamine.

Properties 
2,2-Diethoxytetrahydrofuran is a clear liquid which boils at 10 mm Hg vacuum at 60 - 61.5 °C according to the original literature.

Application 
The cyclic orthoester 2,2-diethoxytetrahydrofuran is a reactive bifunctional monomer which forms biodegradable polyorthoesters of the type POE-I by transesterification with α, ω-diols.

Polyorthoesters are used as embedding media for pharmaceuticals in depot drug dosage forms for controlled drug release by surface erosion under physiological conditions.

References 

Orthoesters
Tetrahydrofurans